Road 96 is a coastal road in southern Iran connecting Abadan to Bandarabbas.

References

External links 

 Iran road map on Young Journalists Club

Roads in Iran
Transportation in Khuzestan Province
Transportation in Bushehr Province
Transportation in Hormozgan Province